The 2021 Rugby Europe Under-18 Championship was held in Kaliningrad, Russia from 3 to 9 October 2021. Georgia won the championship after defeating Portugal 27–0.

Teams

Results

Round 1

Quarter-finals

Round 2

5th-7th Place Semi-finals

Cup Semi-finals

Round 3

7th Place

3rd Place

5th Place

Cup Final

Brackets

References 

2021
Europe
2021–22 in European rugby union
International rugby union competitions hosted by Russia
Youth sport in Russia